Gumede kaZulu was chief of the Zulu people in the 18th century. He was the son of Zulu kaNtombhela and was succeeded by his son, Phunga kaGumede.

Year of birth missing
Year of death missing
Zulu history
Zulu kings
18th-century monarchs in Africa